Daredevil: The Man Without Fear is a 1993 five-issue comic book miniseries starring Daredevil, written by Frank Miller, illustrated by John Romita Jr. and published by Marvel Comics.

Plot
The series explores the origins of the hero Daredevil, whose real name is Matthew Murdock. The first issue explores his childhood, the accident that caused his blindness and powers, as well as his father's death. Throughout the series, readers are exposed to many important characters in Murdock's life, from his mentor, Stick, to his college flame, Elektra, his best friend, Foggy Nelson, and even one of his most primary nemeses, Kingpin, also known as Wilson Fisk. Throughout the comic, Matt Murdock develops his abilities, struggles with anger, and becomes Daredevil.

Reception
The comic has received mostly positive reviews since publication. In 2014, Comic Book Resources' Mark Ginocchio said the series had a strong reputation, adding that it was "so well-composed and filled with wonderfully nuanced scenes" it was hard to believe it came from the early 1990s, a period regarded by fans as a creative low point for the comic industry.

References

1993 comics debuts
Comics by Frank Miller (comics)
Comics set in New York City
Daredevil (Marvel Comics) titles
Daredevil (Marvel Comics) storylines